The qualification for the 2012 Women's Olympic Volleyball Tournament took place from November 20, 2011 to June 10, 2012.

Qualification summary

 The Asian Qualification Tournament will be combined with the World Qualification Tournament. The first 3 place teams of the tournament will qualify as the winners of the World Qualification Tournament while the best Asian team except the top 3 winners qualify as the Asian Qualification Tournament winners.

World Cup

Continental qualification tournaments

Africa
Venue:  Blida, Algeria
Dates: February 2–4, 2012
All times are West Africa Time (UTC+01:00).

|}

|}

Europe

Venue:  Başkent Volleyball Hall, Ankara, Turkey
Dates: May 1–6, 2012

Final standing

North America

Venue:  High Performance Sports Center of Baja California, Tijuana, Baja California, Mexico
Dates: Apr 29 – May 5, 2012

Final standing

South America

Venue:  Ginásio Milton Olaio Filho, São Carlos, São Paulo, Brazil
Dates: May 9–13, 2012

Final standing

World qualification tournament

Venue:  Tokyo Metropolitan Gymnasium, Tokyo, Japan
Dates: May 19–27, 2012

Final standing

References

Qualification Process

Olympic Qualification Women
Olympic Qualification Women

2012
Women's events at the 2012 Summer Olympics